Goober may refer to:

Food
 Another word for a peanut
 Goober (brand), a food product combining peanut butter and fruit preserves
 Goobers, a Nestlé brand name of chocolate-coated peanut

Fictional characters
 Goober Pyle, on the television shows The Andy Griffith Show, Mayberry R.F.D. and Hee-Haw
 Goober, a dog in the 1970s animated series Goober and the Ghost Chasers
 Goober, a gremlin in the BBC children's comedy sketch show Stupid!
 Goober, the player character in the Mac computer game GooBall
 Goober, a member of the Satan's Mothers MC in The Warriors
 Roland Goubert, "The Goober", a main character in the young adult novel The Chocolate War by Robert Cormier

Other uses
 A nickname of Edward E. Cox (1880-1952), US Representative from Georgia
 WGGC, an American FM radio station branded as "Goober 95.1"
 Slang for silly, foolish or old people as epitomized by Goober Pyle